Mahuua is a Nagpuri film starring Stefy Patel and Prince Sondhi. It is directed by Sanjay Verma and produced by Satyen Srivastav.

Plot
The film shows how women fight against social superstition and unsocial elements in order to enact societal change.

Cast
Stefy Patel
Prince Sondhi
Ali Khan
Manoj Verma
Shakti Singh
Punam Singh
Dinesh Deva
Kajal Singh
Raj Sinha
Ajay Ghosh
Shahensa Gaur

Awards

References

External links

Nagpuri-language films